Bapalmuia is a genus of lichen-forming fungi in the family Pilocarpaceae.

Species
Bapalmuia araracuarensis 
Bapalmuia buchananii 
Bapalmuia cacaotica 
Bapalmuia callichroa 
Bapalmuia confusa 
Bapalmuia consanguinea 
Bapalmuia costaricensis 
Bapalmuia halleana 
Bapalmuia ivoriensis 
Bapalmuia juliae 
Bapalmuia lafayetteana 
Bapalmuia lineata 
Bapalmuia marginalis 
Bapalmuia microspora 
Bapalmuia napoensis 
Bapalmuia nigrescens 
Bapalmuia palmularis 
Bapalmuia rotatilis 
Bapalmuia rubicunda 
Bapalmuia serusiauxiana 
Bapalmuia sorediata 
Bapalmuia variratae 
Bapalmuia verrucosa

References

Pilocarpaceae
Lichen genera
Lecanorales genera
Taxa described in 1993
Taxa named by Emmanuël Sérusiaux